Darlings of the Gods is a 1989 Australian mini series about the 1948 trip to Australia by Laurence Olivier and Vivien Leigh and the Old Vic Company, where Olivier and Leigh met Peter Finch.

Cast
 Anthony Higgins - Laurence Olivier
 Mel Martin - Vivien Leigh
 Jerome Ehlers - Peter Finch
 Rhys McConnochie - Ralph Richardson
 Anthony Hawkins - Cecil Tennant
 Barry Quin - Dan Cunningham
 Jackie Kelleher - Elsie Beyer
 Lindy Davies - Antonia Vaughan
 Nicki Paull - June Kelly
 Shane Briant - Cecil Beaton

Home Media 
Not Currently Available on DVD

References

External links
Darlings of the Gods at IMDb
Darlings of the Gods at AustLit

1980s Australian television miniseries
1989 Australian television series debuts
1989 Australian television series endings
1989 television films
1989 films
English-language television shows